William Robins may refer to:
William Robins (priest) (1868–1949), Anglican priest, Archdeacon of Bedford
William Robins (cricketer) (1907–1990), English cricketer and British Army officer
William Robert Robins (1886–1959), English trade unionist and politician

See also
William Robbins (disambiguation)